Novaya Kriusha is a rural locality (a selo) and the administrative center of Novokriushanskoye Rural Settlement, Kalacheyevsky District, Voronezh Oblast, Russia. The population was 1,941 as of 2010. There are 17 streets.

Geography 
Novaya Kriusha is located 31 km southeast of Kalach (the district's administrative centre) by road. Skripnikovo is the nearest rural locality.

References 

Rural localities in Kalacheyevsky District